Giuseppe Grabbi (12 February 1901 – 25 August 1970) was an Italian professional football player who played as a midfielder.

He is also the grandfather of former Juventus player Corrado Grabbi.

Honours
Juventus
 Italian Football Championship: 1925–26

References

External links
 

1901 births
1970 deaths
Footballers from Turin
Italian footballers
Italy international footballers
Juventus F.C. players
Novara F.C. players
Association football midfielders
A.C.S.D. Saluzzo players